Lee Sun-bin (born February 20, 1986, in Seoul, South Korea) is a South Korean figure skater. She is the 2002 South Korean national bronze medalist. Her highest placement at an ISU Championship was 18th at the 2003 Four Continents Figure Skating Championships.

Results

External links
 

South Korean female single skaters
Figure skaters at the 2007 Winter Universiade
1986 births
Living people
Figure skaters from Seoul
Figure skaters at the 2003 Asian Winter Games
Sookmyung Women's University alumni
21st-century South Korean women